The pale-winged dog-like bat (Peropteryx pallidoptera) is a bat species found in Brazil, Colombia, Ecuador, and Peru.

References

Bats of South America
Bats of Brazil
Mammals of Colombia
Mammals of Ecuador
Mammals of Peru
Emballonuridae
Mammals described in 2010